François Joseph Drouot de Lamarche (14 July 1733 – 18 May 1814) briefly commanded a French army during the French Revolutionary Wars. He served in the French Royal Army as a cavalryman. In 1792 he was raised to the rank of general officer and fought at Valmy and Jemappes. The following year he led his troops at Neerwinden, was promoted to general of division and appointed to lead the Army of the North. Within three weeks he was defeated at Famars and resigned his army command. Soon afterward, he was denounced by the Revolutionary authorities and sacked, but he was lucky to escape the guillotine. A young Michel Ney served as his aide de camp. His surname is one of the names inscribed under the Arc de Triomphe, on Column 5.

References

1733 births
1814 deaths
People from Bas-Rhin
French generals
French military personnel of the French Revolutionary Wars
French Republican military leaders of the French Revolutionary Wars
Military leaders of the French Revolutionary Wars
Names inscribed under the Arc de Triomphe
Knights of the Order of Saint Louis
Commandeurs of the Légion d'honneur
Knights of the First French Empire